Stephen Pius Odey (born 15 January 1998) is a Nigerian professional footballer who plays as a forward for Danish Superliga club Randers FC.

Club career
Odey played in the second edition of GTBank-Lagos state principals cup where he was the captain of the winning Dairy Farm Senior secondary school Agege. He also topped the list of the GTBank 13-man all star team of that year. He trained at CampGTBank with 23 other students under lead coach Mark Elis, former coach at Arsenal.

He is the all-time top scorer for MFM in the Nigerian Professional Football League, the highest football league level in Nigeria. Odey was the highest goalscorer for MFM in the 2015–16 season. He scored his first career hat-trick in January 2017 against Lobi Stars.

On 4 October 2017, Odey completed a transfer to Swiss club FC Zürich.

On 28 June 2019, it was confirmed that Odey had joined Genk on a five-year contract. On 11 September 2020, he joined Ligue 2 club Amiens SC on loan. On 31 August 2021, he joined Danish club Randers FC on loan for the 2021-22 season with an option to buy. After scoring five goals in seven games Randers confirmed on 21 November 2021, that they had bought Odey free from Genk at the end of his loan deal, becoming the most expensive transfer in Randers' history. Odey signed a deal until June 2024, running from the 2022-23 season.

International career
On 13 August 2017, Odey made his debut for Nigeria, as a substitute, in a 1–0 loss against Benin.

Honours
Individual
Player of the Month, NPFL League Bloggers Award: January 2017
Player of the Month, NPFL League Bloggers Award: March 2017

FC Zürich
Swiss Cup: 2017–18

References

External links
 
 
 FC Zurich Stats

Living people
1998 births
Sportspeople from Lagos
Nigerian footballers
Association football forwards
Nigeria international footballers
MFM F.C. players
FC Zürich players
K.R.C. Genk players
Amiens SC players
Randers FC players
Nigeria Professional Football League players
Swiss Super League players
Ligue 2 players
Danish Superliga players
Nigerian expatriate footballers
Nigerian expatriate sportspeople in Switzerland
Expatriate footballers in Switzerland
Nigerian expatriate sportspeople in Belgium
Expatriate footballers in Belgium
Nigerian expatriate sportspeople in France
Expatriate footballers in France
Nigerian expatriate sportspeople in Denmark
Expatriate men's footballers in Denmark